The Security Council of Kazakhstan (Qazaqstan Respublikasynyñ Qauıpsızdık Keñesı ) is a constitutional advisory body of the Kazakh Government which aides and assists the President of Kazakhstan in implementation of military policy and law enforcement. The President, who is the Supreme Commander-in-Chief of the Armed Forces of Kazakhstan, is one of many permanent members of the council, which includes the Minister of Defence and the Chief of the General Staff.

The current chairman is President Kassym-Jomart Tokayev, following the January 5, 2022, dismissal of former President Nursultan Nazarbayev as chairman. The Secretary of the Security Council (currently Asset Issekeshev) is the second highest position in the council.

List of Chairmen

History
The Security Council dates back to August 21, 1991, when it was founded as the Security Council of the Kazakh Soviet Socialist Republic, which was created by decree of then-President Nazarbayev. It would later be transformed into the Security Council of the Republic of Kazakhstan in June 1993. The current mandate and regulations of the Security Council were approved by the government on 20 March 1999. The office of Secretary of the Security Council is the effective chief of the council who reports to the chairman. The position was introduced in June 1994 and has remained an important component of the Security Council. An amendment passed by parliament in May 2018 defines the decisions made by the council to be "mandatory and are subject to strict execution by state bodies, organisations and officials of the Republic of Kazakhstan."

Mandate
The Security Council of Kazakhstan has the following mandates:
 To ensure that the president has full control to exercise his/her national security powers.
 To form and implementation a national security policy.
 To recommend options prior to him/her making decisions on domestic and foreign policy issues related to national security.
 To prepare the carrying out of international agreements that repeated to national security.

Members
Permanent members of the Security Council include the following:
 President 
 Prime Minister
 Head of the Presidential Administration
 Secretary of the Security Council 
 Chairman of the National Security Committee
 Foreign Minister
 Minister of Defence

Other members include:
 Chairman of the Parliament
 Chairman of the Senate
 Director of the Foreign Intelligence Service
 Minister of Internal Affairs
 Chief of the General Staff

See also
Government of Kazakhstan
Security Council of Belarus
National Security and Defense Council of Ukraine
Security Council of Russia

References

Government of Kazakhstan
Military of Kazakhstan
Kazakhstan